Gunvantrai Popatbhai Acharya (9 September 1900 – 25 November 1965) was a Gujarati language novelist and journalist from India. His experience with seafarers impacted his adventure and novel writings. His works include several historical fiction novels.

Biography
Acharya was born on 9 September 1900 in Jetalsar near Nawanagar (now Jamnagar, Gujarat, India). He completed his school education from Mandvi, Kutch where he came in contact with seafarers. His father Popatbhai was in police department. He joined college but dropped out after a brief period. He joined Saurashtramitra daily in 1927. He was also associated with several news dailies like Saurashtra, Phulchhab, Prajabandhu and Gujarat Samachar. He was the director of Mojmajah, a film weekly. He was awarded Ranjitram Suvarna Chandrak in 1945. He died on 25 November 1965.<ref name=gsp>{{cite web|url=http://www.gujaratisahityaparishad.com/prakashan/photo-gallery/sahitya-sarjako/Gunvantrai-Acharya.html|title=કર્તા પરિચય: ગુણવંતરાય પોપટભાઈ આચાર્ય  Gunvatrai Popatlal Acharya|work =Gujarati Sahitya Parishad|date=12 September 2014|language =gu}}</ref>

His daughters, Ila Arab Mehta and Varsha Adalja, are also authors.

Works
Acharya wrote 169 books including fictional novels, historical novels, short story collections, adventure novels, teen stories, humor and mystery novels. His novels about seafarers and their adventure were widely popular. His Dariyalal (The Beloved Sea, 1934), an adventure novel about seafarers of Gujarat and their settlement in East Africa based on oral history, won him popularity. His Kalpavruksha was focused on caste issues of the time. His other novels include Bhagavo Nejo (1937), Sarfarosh (1953), Ratnakar Maharaj (1964). His historical novels include Girnarne Khole (1946), Senapati (1947), Gurjarlaxmi (1952), Shridhar Mehta (1957), Karad Kal Jage Part 1 and 2 (1957), Bhoot Rade Bhenkar (1961). His historical novel series on Vaghela dynasty of Gujarat includes Vishaldev (1960), Arjundev (1961), Idariyo Gadh (1962). His notable social novels are Kori Kitab (1935), Viratno Zabbo (1938), Putrajanma (1940), Ramkahani (1941). Chhelli Salam (1962), Kedi ane Kanta (1962) and Sakkarbaar are spy fictions. Otana Pani (1938), Shri ane Saraswati (1956), Neelrekha (1962), Jobanpagi (1964) are his novella collections.

He wrote plays also. Allabeli (The God is the Protector, 1946), Jogmaya ane Sheelalekh (1949), Akhovan (1957), Maar Raj (1957) are his play collections.

His other works are Hu Bavo ne Mangaldas (1936), Subhashchandra Bose (1946), Munjhavata Prashno (1947), Aapne Fari Na Vichariye ?'' (1959).

Bibliography

See also
 List of Gujarati-language writers

References

External links
 

1900 births
1965 deaths
Gujarati-language writers
Indian male journalists
Indian male novelists
20th-century Indian novelists
Gujarati people
People from Jamnagar district
Novelists from Gujarat
Recipients of the Ranjitram Suvarna Chandrak
20th-century Indian male writers